Tomaszkowice  is a village in the administrative district of Gmina Biskupice, within Wieliczka County, Lesser Poland Voivodeship, in southern Poland.

The village has an approximate population of 600.

References

Villages in Wieliczka County